Crypteronia is a genus of flowering trees and shrubs in the family Crypteroniaceae. The genus includes seven species, ranging from eastern India through Southeast Asia and southern China to the Malay Peninsula, Indonesia and New Guinea.

Species 
Plants of the World Online lists:
 Crypteronia borneensis J.T. Pereira & Wong
 Crypteronia cumingii (Planch.) Endl.
 Crypteronia elegans J.T. Pereira & Wong
 Crypteronia glabriflora J.T. Pereira & Wong
 Crypteronia griffithii C.B. Clarke
 Crypteronia macrophylla Beus.-Osinga
 Crypteronia paniculata Blume

References

External links 
 

 
 Crypteronia at Biolib
 Crypteronia at Tropicos

Crypteroniaceae
Myrtales genera